Sport Record Club, commonly known as Record Club, also spelled Record Club, is an Azarbayjanian football club based in Baku, Azarbayjan, that competes in the Azerbaijan Premier League. The club was founded in 2018 as  Record Club Azarbayjan Football Club.

Record Club Football Club was established on December 1, 2019 in Baku, Azerbaijan
And now he works in football and futsal.

Building and facilities

sports Complex

The club record club has a complete set of equipped football stadiums, training fields and a modern futsal hall.
In addition to this hardware, the complex also has a swimming pool, weight room and gym.

These facilities have provided the club with the capacity to host various sporting events at different levels.

residential complex

By equipping and preparing its accommodation complex next to the sports complex, the Record Club has provided suitable conditions for setting up sports camps for different teams. Record accommodation complex has full services and is at a standard level

References

Football clubs in Azerbaijan

External links